Atle Kittang (20 March 1941 – 1 June 2013) was a Norwegian literary researcher and literary critic.

His doctorate thesis from 1973 was a study on the French poet Arthur Rimbaud. He was professor at the University of Bergen, since 1974. His research included studies on works by Knut Hamsun and Henrik Ibsen. Among his books are Litteraturkritiske problem (1975) and Moderne litteraturteori – en innføring (1993). He was a member of the Norwegian Academy of Science and Letters.

References

1941 births
2013 deaths
Norwegian literary critics
Knut Hamsun researchers
Norwegian non-fiction writers
Academic staff of the University of Bergen
Members of the Norwegian Academy of Science and Letters
People from Flora, Norway
Nynorsk-language writers
Henrik Ibsen researchers
Royal Norwegian Society of Sciences and Letters